Gutenberg Alejandro Martínez Ocamica (born 29 August 1950) is a Chilean politician who served as President of the Chamber of Deputies and as a member of the Chamber of Deputies, representing District 21 of Santiago.

References

External Links
 BCN Profile

1950 births
Living people
People from Santiago
Presidents of the Chamber of Deputies of Chile
University of Chile alumni
Christian Democratic Party (Chile) politicians